Rhynchopsitta phillipsi is an extinct species of thick-billed parrot. It was described in 1997 from Late Pleistocene cave deposits from Nuevo León in northeastern Mexico. The specific epithet honours American ornithologist Allan Robert Phillips.

References

Rhynchopsitta
Birds described in 1997
Fossil taxa described in 1997
Pleistocene birds of North America